Thomas Edwin Blanton Jr. (June 20, 1938 – June 26, 2020) was an American terrorist and convicted felon, formerly serving four life sentences for his role as conspirator in the 16th Street Baptist Church bombing in Birmingham, Alabama on September 15, 1963, which killed four African-American girls (Carole Robertson, Cynthia Wesley, Addie Mae Collins, and Denise McNair). Blanton, along with Bobby Frank Cherry, was convicted in 2001 in a highly publicized trial of the cold case.

Early life 

Blanton was born in Washington, D.C. on June 20, 1938, and was the son of Thomas Edwin "Pops" Blanton Sr., who was described in 2001 as a notorious racist in the Birmingham, Alabama area.

Education and career 
Blanton had a tenth-grade education and served as an aircraft mechanic in the Navy from 1956 to 1959. Blanton was a member of the Ku Klux Klan in the early 1960s, along with the other suspects in the bombing.

Trial and imprisonment 
At the time of his arrest, Blanton was working at a Walmart store and he was living in a trailer with no running water.

Blanton was a suspect from early in the investigation, but J. Edgar Hoover prevented attempts by the Birmingham office of the F.B.I. to bring charges against Blanton and three other men. This was reportedly because Hoover thought a successful prosecution was unlikely. In a jury trial in 2001, Blanton was prosecuted by the state, and convicted of murder. He was sentenced to four life sentences in state prison.

He was housed at Holman Correctional Facility in Atmore, Alabama. Blanton went before the parole board on August 3, 2016. Parole was denied and deferred until 2021.

Death
On June 26, 2020, Blanton died at William E. Donaldson Correctional Facility from unspecified causes while serving his life sentence, six days after his 82nd birthday.

See also
African-American history
Civil Rights Movement
Birmingham campaign
Mass racial violence in the United States

Further reading

References

1930 births
2020 deaths
1963 murders in the United States
American mass murderers
American murderers of children
American people convicted of murder
American prisoners sentenced to life imprisonment
History of Birmingham, Alabama
Place of birth missing
Former Ku Klux Klan members
People convicted of murder by Alabama
People from Springville, Alabama
Military personnel from Washington, D.C.
Prisoners sentenced to life imprisonment by Alabama
Prisoners who died in Alabama detention
American Ku Klux Klan members